Emerald Canyon is a canyon and watercourse in Laguna Beach, Orange County, California, which drains a section of the San Joaquin Hills  northwest of central Laguna Beach.

The canyon is located inside Laguna Coast Wilderness Park, and has trails for hiking and mountain biking. However, it is only accessible from the north (uphill) end, as the lower part terminates in private property.

Emerald Canyon has been historically known as Mayate Canyon and Nigger Canyon.

See also
List of rivers of Orange County, California

References

Rivers of Orange County, California